Samir Farid (December 1, 1943 – April 4, 2017) was an Egyptian writer and a world renowned film critic, journalist and film historian based in Cairo. He authored and/or translated over 60 books since 1966 on Egyptian, Arab and World cinema. He was the consultant for Cinema affairs in the Bibliotheca Alexandrina. (2001-2016).

He was a member of jury in International film festivals since 1972. (Among them Oberhausen Film Festival 1978, DOC Leipzig Film festival 1984, Annecy International Animated Film Festival 1998, Torino Film Festival 2001, Controcorrente (Upstream section) of  Venice Film Festival 2003, Thessaloniki Film Festival 2003 and Taormina Film Festival 2010.)

He also was the Head of The Cairo International Film Festival 2014.

Curriculum vitae
Samir Farid was born in Cairo, Egypt in 1943. He graduated in 1965 from the High Institute of Dramatic Arts, department of Criticism, Academy of Arts. His graduation thesis was entitled "The Meaning of Silence in Waiting for Godot by Samuel Beckett". He also worked as the film Critic of Al-Gomhoreya daily in Cairo since 1965. Since 1967, he has been invited to more than 200 film festivals and seminars in Africa, Asia, USA and Europe.

He was a member of the Board in the Egyptian magazines Al-Cinema (1969) and Al-Talliaa (Arabic: الطليعة )  in 1973, the Algerian magazine Al-Shshtan (1979) and the Cypriot magazine Al-Ofok (1987).

He was a co-Founder of the National Festival of Short and Documentary films (1970), the National Festival of Feature Films (1971), the Arab Film Critics Union and the Egyptian Film Critics Association, (1972).

Member of FIPRESCI since 1971.

Member of International Jury Boards since 1972.

The editor-in-chef of the Egyptian weekly journal El-Cinema Wa El-Finoun, 1977.

Member of the International Initiating Committee of the General History of Cinema 1982.

The representative of Variety in Cairo 1981- 1985.

Member of the Consultative Board of the Minister of Culture, 1989.

The Cinema Supervisor at Bibliotheca Alexandrina, 2001.

Published books
 Cinema 65, Cairo, 1966
 Film Guide 66, Cairo, 1967
 U.S.A. Films in the Arab World, Cairo, 1967
 Fahrenheit 451 (Film by François Truffaut), Cairo, 1967
 The World through the Eye of the Camera (Cinema 66-67), Cairo, 1968
 Cinema 69 (Cinema 68-69), Cairo, 1970
 Cinema 70, Cairo, 1971
 Dictionary of Selected Egyptian Film Directors, Cairo, 1974
 October War into Film, Cairo, 1975
 On Cannes Festival (1967–1973), Cairo, 1978
 Arab Cinema Guide(Arabic-English) (Dossier on Egypt), Cairo, 1978
 Arab Cinema Guide(Arabic-English) (Dossier on Iraq), Cairo, 1979
 Reflections on Contemporary Cinema, Baghdad, 1979
 Studies on Arab Cinema, Beirut, 1981
 An introduction to Zionism Cinema, Beirut, 1981
 Shakesperian Films, Beirut, 1981
 The Identity of the Arab Cinema, Beirut, 1988
 Naguib Mahfouz and the Cinema, Cairo, 1990
 Dialogue with 24 World Film, Cairo, 1991
 Reflections on Chahine's Cinema, Cairo, 1992
 The New Realism in Egyptian Cinema, Cairo, 1992
 Cannes Film Festival (1946–1991), Beirut, 1992
 The Arab-Zionism Conflict in Cinema, Cairo, 1992
 Cinema of Oppression, Cinema of Liberation, Damascus, 1992
 Dialogues With 15 Egyptian Filmmakers, Cairo, 1993
 Children Cinema, Cairo, 1994
 Unknown Pages in Egyptian Cinema, Cairo, 1994
 Faten Hamama, Cairo, 1995
 Reflections on Chahine's Cinema (2nd Edition), Cairo, 1997
 The Palestinian Cinema in the Occupied Lands, Cairo, 1997
 The Contemporary Arab Cinema, Cairo, 1998
 The History of the Filmmakers' Syndicate in Egypt, Cairo, 1999
 Hassan Imam Omar: The Pillar of the Cinema Press in Egypt, Cairo, 1999
 The Writers of Egypt and the Cinema, Cairo, 1999
 Directors and Directions in Arab Cinema, Bahrain, 2000
 Directors and Directions in Egyptian Cinema, Cairo, 2000
 Zouzou Hamdi El-Hakim: A Pioneer of Acting and Enlightenment, Cairo, 2000
 Stars and Legends in Egyptian Cinema, Cairo, 2000
 Films in the Shadow, Cairo, 2000
 Introduction to the History of Arab Cinema, Cairo, 2000
 Introduction to the History of Arab Cinema (Italian), Tunis, 2001
 Directors and Directions in American Cinema, Damascus, 2001
 The History of Film Censorship in Egypt, Cairo, 2002
 Shakespeare, The Screen Writer, Cairo, 2002
 Cannes Film Festival Guide (1946–2001), Alexandria, 2002
 Studies on the History of Egyptian Cinema, Cairo, 2002
 Directors and Directions in European Cinema, Damascus, 2003
 World Writers and cinema, Cairo, 2003
 Venice Film Festival Guide (1932–2003), Alexandria, 2004
 Political Issues on Cinema Screen, Damascus, 2004
 The Cinema in the European Union Member States (4 Volumes), Cairo, 2004
 Cinema and Arts, Cairo, 2005
 The New Wave in Egyptian Cinema, Damascus, 2005

See also
Lists of Egyptians
نقاد مصريون

References

External links
 Article by Samir Farid
 https://variety.com/2003/film/markets-festivals/hep-hit-venice-highlight-1117890846/

1943 births
2017 deaths
Egyptian film critics
Writers from Cairo